Iron March was a far-right neo-fascist and neo-Nazi web forum. The site opened in 2011 and attracted neo-fascist and neo-Nazi members, including militants from organized far-right groups and members who would later go on to commit acts of terror. The forum closed in 2017. Subsequently, former users moved to alternative websites and social networking services, such as Discord. In 2019, an anonymous individual leaked the database that hosted all Iron March content.

History
Russian nationalist Alisher Mukhitdinov (who goes by the moniker "Alexander Slavros") founded the online message board Iron March in 2011. Mukhitdinov is a Russian-Uzbekistani related to Nuritdin Mukhitdinov, a former communist leader of Uzbekistan. Since the 2010s, the political ideology and religious worldview of the Order of Nine Angles (ONA), a theistic Satanist organization founded by the British Neo-Nazi leader David Myatt in 1974, have increasingly influenced militant neo-fascist and Neo-Nazi insurgent groups associated with right-wing extremist and White supremacist international networks, most notably the Iron March forum.

Iron March became a platform for militant neo-fascist and Neo-Nazi violent groups such as the Nordic Resistance Movement, National Action, Azov Battalion, CasaPound, and Golden Dawn. Some of the board's members were later linked to several acts of terrorism and murder, such as the murder of an anti-fascist in Helsinki in September 2016 and the murder of a left-wing rapper in 2013. A group consisting of Serbian Combat 18, "MC Srbi", and Atomwaffen also used the forum to traffic firearms. The forum's users organized a number of violent neo-Nazi groups, including the Atomwaffen Division, Antipodean Resistance, and National Action. The userbase embraced the accelerationist ideology of James Mason, a Neo-Nazi and associate of the serial killer Charles Manson. Members of Iron March republished and popularized Mason's book "Siege" and its brand of explicitly terroristic neo-nazism. According to SPLC:
[Iron March] became home base for those who were personally invested in neo-Nazism, fascism and organized white extremism on a global scale ... through total immersion in Mason's teleology, now, they are challenging the established far-right and far-left with their eagerness to perpetrate violence.

In 2016, posters urging students to visit the Iron March website were posted on university campuses, including those of Boston University, Old Dominion University, and the University of Chicago. These posters included racist and antisemitic slogans, including "#Hitler Disapproves", "No Degeneracy, No Tolerance, Hail Victory", and "Black Lives Don't Matter".

The website closed in November 2017; the reasons for its closure remain unclear as of late 2019. According to an investigation by BBC Russia, it is suspected Mukhitdinov was pressured by the Russian government for raising funds for the neo-nazi Azov Battalion, which is considered a terrorist group in the Russian Federation. A spokesperson for Azov refused to comment on the case.

In 2018, Iron March-affiliated Discord servers alongside several other hate-group servers were removed by the messaging service.

In April 2018, a networking site called Fascist Forge was launched; according to a note by its founder, it was meant as a replacement for Iron March. The site continued Iron March's virulent propaganda and grew rapidly until February 2019, when the site was taken offline by its registrar.

Notable users

In February 2015, three people were arrested for planning to commit a mass shooting at a shopping mall in Halifax, Nova Scotia, on February 14 that year. One of the suspects, 23-year-old Lindsay Souvannarath of Illinois, was found to have been an active member of Iron March, to have been the ex-girlfriend of Iron March founder "Slavros", and to have made many online posts in favor of fascist or neo-Nazi ideologies.

Devon Arthurs, an Iron March user and member of the Atomwaffen Division (AWD), killed his two roommates, also members of AWD, in May 2017. Police found neo-nazi literature, radioactive materials, a photograph of Oklahoma City bomber Timothy McVeigh, and explosives in his home. Arthurs' remaining roommate and fellow Iron March user Brandon Russell was arrested in Tampa, Florida, for stockpiling of illegal weapons and bomb-making materials. Russell had been among Iron March's most prolific users, having written around 1,500 posts on the site.

As a result of the Iron March leak in 2019, it was discovered the Latvian national-conservative politician and activist Raivis Zeltīts had posted on Iron March under the handle "Latvian_Integralist". Zeltīts acknowledged in a Facebook post that he had written using this handle, but Zeltīts said that he no longer held those views. Zeltīts remained in contact with Iron March administrator Benjamin Raymond as late as 2015.

Zack Davies, 26, of Mold, North Wales, attacked a Sikh man with a machete and claw hammer while shouting "White Power". Davies inflicted life-threatening injuries; in the judge's view, the victim would have died had Davies not been stopped by passers-by. In 2015 a British court found Davies guilty and assigned him a life sentence (with a minimum tariff of 14 years). Davies had an Iron March account and was a member of the British terrorist group National Action, which was proscribed in 2016.

Leaked database and effects 
In November 2019, an unknown individual uploaded a database of Iron March users to the Internet Archive; multiple neo-Nazi users, including an ICE detention center captain and several active members of the US armed forces, were identified using information from the leak.

A variety of individuals and organizations used information from the leak:
 Journalistic outlets and anti-fascist groups used the information to reveal the identities of users of the site. 
 The open-source journalism outlet Bellingcat and online magazine Small Wars Journal performed data analysis on the entire corpus to understand the online radicalization processes of the far-right. 
 Brett Stevens, editor of the far-right site "Amerika.org", used contact information from the leak to contact former Iron March users and direct them to his website. 
 In September 2020, researchers at the Center on Terrorism, Extremism, and Counterterrorism used the forum dump as training data for the sophisticated, flexible natural language generating artificial intelligence model GPT-3. They found that GPT-3--or more likely a copy of it if proper safety and sanitizing protocols are observed by OpenAI--could easily be used for misinformation and radicalization purposes.

References

Alt-right Internet forums
Neo-Nazi websites
Political Internet forums
Websites with far-right material
Accelerationism